Rustyam Gusmanovich Fakhrutdinov (born 5 September 1963) is a former Russian professional footballer of ethnic Tatar origin.

Club career
He made his professional debut in the Soviet Second League in 1988 for FC Druzhba Yoshkar-Ola. He scored the first goal of FC Krylia Sovetov Samara in the Russian Premier League on 9 April 1992 in a game against FC Asmaral Moscow.

References

1963 births
People from Zelenodolsk, Russia
Tatar people of Russia
Tatar sportspeople
Living people
Soviet footballers
Association football forwards
Russian footballers
PFC Krylia Sovetov Samara players
FC KAMAZ Naberezhnye Chelny players
FC Neftekhimik Nizhnekamsk players
FC Lada-Tolyatti players
Russian Premier League players
FC Nosta Novotroitsk players
Sportspeople from Tatarstan